Creake is the main element of the names of two villages in Norfolk, England: Creek or Crick as it's pronounced in the Southe Creake.

North Creake
South Creake

See also
Creake Abbey

Villages in Norfolk
King's Lynn and West Norfolk